Yu Tao (born October 15, 1981 in Shanghai) is a Chinese international  football player as a midfielder.

Club career
Yu Tao began his football career playing for Shanghai 02 before the club was taken over by Shanghai Shenhua and he was promoted to their senior side at the beginning of the 2002 league season, where he made twenty four league games and would score four goals. By the following season, he would become an integral member of the Shenhua team due to his ability to play in numerous positions in the midfield and would help them to win the league 2003 league title. Unfortunately in 2013 the Chinese Football Association would revoke the league title after it was discovered the Shenhua General manager Lou Shifang had bribed officials to be bias to Shenhua in games that season.

Despite several changes in management and the influx of players from the Shanghai United merger, Yu Tao has been a constant regular for Shanghai Shenhua throughout his career. By the 2010 league season his loyalty towards Shanghai would be rewarded when he was named the club's captain and on May 8, 2010 in a league game against Liaoning Whowin, he would become the club's most capped player when he made his one hundred and eighty sixth league appearance for the club. This was soon followed by him also reaching 200 league  appearances for the club on August 29, 2010 in a league game against Dalian Shide, which ended in a 1-1 draw.

On 20 December 2012, Yu moved to Shanghai Shenxin on a free transfer, he signed a three-year-deal with Shenxin. On 23 December 2015, Yu transferred to China League One side Beijing Enterprises Group on a free transfer.

International career
Yu Tao would be called up into the Chinese managers Arie Haan's first game against Syria in a friendly on 7 December 2002 in a 3-1 win. After that game, he would become an irregular member for the national team, but this would not be enough to make the squad for the 2004 AFC Asian Cup. After several years in the international wilderness, the next Chinese manager Zhu Guanghu would call him up for a friendly against Kazakhstan on February 7, 2007 in a 2-1 victory. In preparation for the 2007 AFC Asian Cup, Zhu Guanghu included Yu Tao in several further squads but decided not in include him for the final tournament. The introduction of Gao Hongbo as the Chinese manager that saw Yu Tao given his chance of a competitive tournament when he was called him up for the 2011 AFC Asian Cup.

Honours
Shanghai Shenhua
Chinese Jia-A League: 2003 (revoked due to match-fixing scandal)

References

External links
Player Profile at Shanghai Shenhua website
Player Profile at Football-lineups website
Player Profile at Sodasoccer.com

Player stats at Sohu.com

1981 births
Living people
Association football midfielders
Chinese footballers
Footballers from Shanghai
China international footballers
Shanghai Shenhua F.C. players
Shanghai Shenxin F.C. players
Beijing Sport University F.C. players
Chinese Super League players
China League One players
2011 AFC Asian Cup players
Footballers at the 2002 Asian Games
Asian Games competitors for China